William Dunbabin (26 October 1894 – 3 December 1975) was an Australian politician.

He was born at Bream Creek, Tasmania. In 1953 he was elected to the Tasmanian Legislative Council as the independent member for Pembroke. He served until his defeat in 1959. Dunbabin died in Hobart in 1975.

References

1894 births
1975 deaths
Independent members of the Parliament of Tasmania
Members of the Tasmanian Legislative Council
20th-century Australian politicians